Alma Staudinger (19 August 1921 – 10 October 2017) was an Austrian diver. She competed at the 1948 Summer Olympics.

References

External links
 

1921 births
2017 deaths
Austrian female divers
Olympic divers of Austria
Divers at the 1936 Summer Olympics
Divers at the 1948 Summer Olympics
Place of birth missing